Carlo Luciano Alessio (1919–24 June 2006) was an Italian mycologist. He was known for his expertise in the agaric genera Inocybe and Boletus.

Species described
Rubroboletus pulchrotinctus Alessio (1985)
Hebelomina microspora Alessio (1977)
Inocybe abnormispora Alessio (1987)
Inocybe pseudobrunnea Alessio (1987)
Inocybe pseudograta Alessio (1983)
Inocybe substraminea Alessio (1980)
Inocybe urbana Alessio (1980)
Lyophyllum solitarium Alessio (1983)
Psalliota infida Alessio (1975)
Xerocomus ichnusanus Alessio (1984)
Xerocomus roseoalbidus Alessio (1987)

See also
List of mycologists

References

Italian mycologists
1919 births
2006 deaths